The Derby della Madonnina, also known as the Derby di Milano (Milan Derby, in English), is a derby football match between the two prominent Milanese clubs, Inter Milan and A.C. Milan.

Because of their more prosperous ancestry, Inter fans had the "luxury" to go to the San Siro stadium by motorcycle (another nickname given to the ). Today, this difference has largely been mitigated.

Taking place at least twice during the year via the league fixtures, this cross-town rivalry has extended to the Coppa Italia, Champions League, and Supercoppa Italiana, as well as minor tournaments and friendlies. It is one of the only major crosstown derbies in association football that are always played in the same stadium, in this case the San Siro, as both Milan and Internazionale call San Siro "home".

History 

On 13 December 1899, Herbert Kilpin and others founded the Milan Cricket and Football Club. Alfred Edwards, a former British vice-consul in Milan and a well-known personality of the Milanese high society, was the club's first elected president. Initially, the team included a cricket section, managed by Edward Berra, and a football section managed by David Allison. The Milan team soon gained relevant notability under Herbert Kilpin's guide. The first trophy to be won was the Medaglia del Re ("King's Medal") in January 1900, and the team later won three national leagues, in 1901, 1906 and 1907. The triumph of 1901 was particularly relevant because it ended the consecutive series of wins of Genoa, which had been the only team to have won the title prior to 1901. On 9 March 1908, issues over the signing of foreign players led to a split and the foundation of Football Club Internazionale.

The first derby match between the two Milanese rivals was held in the final of the Chiasso Cup of 1908, a football tournament played in Canton Ticino, Switzerland, on 18 October of that year; the Rossoneri won 2–1. While Inter and Milan faced each other sporadically in the early years, the rivalry has been renewed annually since the inaugural 1926–27 season of the Divisione Nazionale, the first truly national Italian league. The two teams have played each other at least twice a year since then.

In the 1960s, the Milan derby saw two big stars of Italian football come face-to-face. One of the most representative players of Inter was Sandro Mazzola, the son of former Torino player Valentino Mazzola who, along with most of his Torino teammates, died in the 1949 Superga air disaster after dominating Serie A for four seasons. His Milan counterpart was Gianni Rivera, nicknamed "Golden Boy" for his talent. This era saw brilliant derby matches and an increasing rivalry: while Milan won the European Cup in 1962–63, Inter followed with back-to-back success in the following years. Milan again won the title in 1968–69. During this successful period for both teams, Milan were coached by Nereo Rocco and Inter by Helenio Herrera, both coaching many notable players. The rivalry continued on the Italian national team, where two players from their respective clubs would often not play together, with one usually being substituted by the other at half-time. Rivera ended up losing the starting line-up to Mazzola in the 1970 final against Brazil, in which Italy was defeated 1–4 by the South Americans. He would later enter in the 84th minute after Italy were already far behind.

Arguably Milan's greatest-ever era took place during the late 1980s and had extended through to the mid-2000s. Often hailed as the greatest-ever Milan side, the team stemming from the 1989 European champions managed by Arrigo Sacchi, contained legendary Milan players, Marco van Basten, Ruud Gullit, Frank Rijkaard and Paolo Maldini, amongst others. Milan's dominance, both domestically and internationally, had seen them capture four league titles and three European Cups (finishing runners-up two additional times) between 1989 and 1996. During this time, Inter had gone on to finish runners-up in the 1992–93 season (behind Milan) and won two UEFA Cups.

Inter's long wait for a league title that began after 1989 finally arrived in 2006, when the Calciopoli scandal stripped Juventus of the 2005–06 title (as well as deducting points from Milan's final overall total) and handed it to Inter, who originally finished third behind both Juventus and Milan. This was seen as a controversial decision by many, as even though the title won the previous season by Juventus was also stripped, it was left unawarded, which many felt should have also been the case with the 2005–06 title. Inter went on to win the 2006–07 Serie A title as well in a season that saw Juventus relegated from the top division, and Milan, as punishment, starting the season with negative points. Inter's triumphant campaign included a record-breaking run of 17 consecutive victories and victories in both fixtures against Milan. During the same season, however, Milan had captured their seventh European Cup/UEFA Champions League, defeating Liverpool in the Final in Athens. As the Italian league recovered from the aftermath of the match-fixing scandal, Inter continued to dominate, winning each league up until the 2009–10 season in which they secured the title on the last day of the season. That season had also seen Inter become the first Italian side to win a treble. In addition to their league title, Inter also secured the Coppa Italia and their first Champions League title since 1965. The following season, however, Milan, with the acquisition of several players that included former Inter striker Zlatan Ibrahimović, recaptured the Scudetto, their 18th overall, leading the league standings from as early as November until the end of the season. That season also saw Milan win both derby matches, keeping clean sheets in both fixtures.

Since 2011–12, both Milan teams have lagged behind Juventus in Serie A, with a disappointing ninth-place finish for Inter in 2012–13 and a difficult campaign for Milan in 2014–15, finishing tenth. Despite this, Inter have been the better of the two in derby matches, with eleven wins (including one in the 2020–21 Coppa Italia), six draws and five losses (including one in the 2011 Supercoppa Italiana and one in the 2017–18 Coppa Italia). Inter would then win a nineteenth title in 2020–21, overtaking Milan's total. However, Milan tied Inter's total by winning their nineteenth title in the following year.

Official match results

Key 
 Colors

 Competitions
 SF = Semi-finals
 QF = Quarter-finals
 R16 = Round of 16
 R32 = Round of 32
 GS = Group stage
 R1 = Round 1
 R2 = Round 2

Results

Statistics

Top goalscorers

Below is the list of players who have scored at least six goals in official meetings.

Most appearances

Below is the list of players who have played at least thirty games in official meetings.

Manager appearances

Records

 Most goals in a single derby: 11, Internazionale 6–5 Milan (6 November 1949)
 Largest derby margin of victory for Milan: 0–6 (11 May 2001)
 Largest derby margin of victory for Internazionale: 0–5 (6 February 1910)
 Most derby wins in a row: 6, Milan (from 5 February 1911 to 9 February 1919, and from 30 May 1946 to 11 April 1948)
 Most consecutive derby draws: 4 (from 29 September 1935 to 7 February 1937)
 Most consecutive derby matches without a win: 17, Milan (from 10 November 1929 to 7 February 1937)
 Most goals in consecutive derbies for a player: 5, Romelu Lukaku (from 21 September 2019 to 21 February 2021)
 Fastest derby goal scored for Internazionale: Sandro Mazzola, after 13 seconds (24 February 1963)
 Fastest derby goal scored for Milan: José Altafini, after 25 seconds (26 March 1961)
 Most goals in a single derby for a Milan player: 4, José Altafini (27 March 1960)
 Most goals in a single derby for an Internazionale player: 3, Giovanni Capra (6 February 1910), Amedeo Amadei (6 November 1949), István Nyers (1 November 1953), Diego Milito (6 May 2012) and Mauro Icardi (15 October 2017)
 Most derbies played in a calendar year: 4 (1946, 1958, 1968, 1972, 1974, 1975, 1985, 1993, 1994, 1998, 2003, 2005 and 2022)
 Youngest goalscorer in a derby: Edoardo Mariani (27 February 1910, aged 16 years and 359 days)
 Oldest goalscorer in a derby: Zlatan Ibrahimović (26 January 2021, aged 39 years and 115 days)

Head-to-head ranking in Serie A (1930–2022)

• Total: Milan with 40 higher finishes, Inter with 47 higher finishes, and 1 equal finish (as of the end of the 2021–22 season). No head-to-heads in 1981 and 1983, since Milan was in Serie B.

Notes:
 Both teams qualified for the final round of 8 teams in 1946  
 Both teams finished with the same number of points in 1958, and the regulation of the time did not contemplate tiebreakers: both teams finished in ninth place
 Both teams finished with the same number of points in 1991, but Milan had better goal difference: Milan finished in second place, Inter in third.

Players who played for both clubs
Note: Senior club appearances and goals counted for the domestic league only. Player names in bold are still active for one of the two clubs. Updated per 5 March 2023.

Inter, then Milan

Milan, then Inter

Coaches who worked at both clubs
 József Viola (1928–1929. Inter, 1933–1934, 1938–1940. Milan)
 Giuseppe Bigogno (1946–1949. Milan, 1958–1959. Inter)
 Giovanni Trapattoni (1974, 1975–1976. Milan, 1986–1991. Inter)
 Luigi Radice (1981–1982. Milan, 1983–1984. Inter)
 Ilario Castagner (1982–1984. Milan, 1984–1985. Inter)
 Alberto Zaccheroni (1998–2001. Milan, 2003–2004. Inter)
 Leonardo Araújo (2009–2010. Milan, 2010–2011. Inter)
 Stefano Pioli (2016–2017. Inter, 2019–present Milan)
also
 Aldo Cevenini (1909–1912, 1915–1919. Milan, 1912–1915, 1919–1921, 1922–1923. Inter as player, 1916–1918. Milan as coach)
 Francesco Soldera (1914–1924. Milan, 1924–1926. Inter as player, 1922. Milan as coach)
 Giuseppe Marchi (1926–1933. Milan as player, 1942–1944. Inter as youth team coach)
 Mariano Tansini (1927–1930, 1933–1934. Milan as player, 1949–1950. Inter as coach)
 Giuseppe Meazza (1927–1940, 1946–1947. Inter, 1940–1942. Milan as player, 1946–1948, 1955–1956, 1957. Inter as coach)
 Giuseppe Viani (1928–1934. Inter as player, 1957–1960. Milan as coach)
 Italo Galbiati (1958–1960. Inter as player, 1981, 1982, 1984. Milan as coach)
 Luigi Radice (1955–1959, 1960, 1961–1965. Milan as player, 1981–1982. Milan, 1983–1984. Inter as coach)
 Lorenzo Barlassina (1965–1968. Inter, ?–?. Milan as chief executive officer)
 Giorgio Morini (1967–1968. Inter, 1976–1981. Milan as player, 1996. Milan as coach)
 Giovanni Trapattoni (1959–1971. Milan as player, 1974, 1975–1976. Milan, 1986–1991. Inter as coach)
 Osvaldo Bagnoli (1955–1957. Milan as player, 1992–1994. Inter as coach)
 Sergio Maddè (1965–1967. Milan as player, 1992–1994. Inter as assistant coach)
 Ottavio Bianchi (1973–1974. Milan as player, 1994–1995. Inter as coach)
 Massimo Pedrazzini (1969–1975. Milan as player, 1991–1996. Milan, 1996–1997, 1998–2000. Inter as youth team coach, 2000–2001. Inter as assistant coach)
 Giuliano Terraneo (1984–1986. Milan as player, 2000. Inter as sports director)
 Leonardo Araújo (1997–2001, 2002–2003. Milan as player, 2009–2010. Milan, 2010–2011. Inter as coach)
 Carmine Nunziata (1985–1986. Inter as player, 2010–2011. Milan as assistant coach)
 Beniamino Abate (1991–1994. Inter as player, 2001–2008. Milan as goalkeeper coach)
 Marco Landucci (1995–1996. Inter as player, 2010–2014. Milan as goalkeeper coach)
 Paolo Benetti (1982–1983. Milan as player, 2011–2012. Inter as assistant coach)
 Clarence Seedorf (2000–2002. Inter, 2002–2012. Milan as player, 2014. Milan as coach)
 Giulio Nuciari (1982–1988. Milan as player, 2014–2016. Inter as assistant coach)
 Siniša Mihajlović (2004–2006. Inter as player, 2006–2008. Inter as assistant coach, 2015–2016. Milan as coach)
 Cristian Brocchi (1994–1998, 2001–2008. Milan, 2000–2001. Inter as player, 2016. Milan as coach)
 Stefano Agresti (1998–2001. Milan, 2003–2004. Inter as assistant coach)
 Marco Fassone (2012–2015. Inter, 2017–2018. Milan as chief executive officer)
 Matteo Villa (1988–1989. Milan as player, 2017–present Inter as youth team coach)
 Davide Lucarelli (2016–2017. Inter, 2019–present Milan as assistant coach)
 Giacomo Murelli (2016–2017. Inter, 2019–present Milan as assistant coach)
 Luca Castellazzi (2010–2014. Inter as player, 2022–present Milan as youth team goalkeeper coach)

Trophies

References

External links

All about AC Milan and Inter Milan
Inter's archive about the Milan derby
Milan derby: chronology and statistics
STORIA DEL DERBY DELLA "MADONNINA"

Madonnina
Football in Milan
A.C. Milan
Inter Milan